PWB may refer to:

 Partial Weight-bearing, in which patients are instructed to put only a certain amount of weight on their leg after surgery
 Printed wiring board
 Psychological well-being
 Programmer's Workbench,
 an early UNIX from Bell Labs, see PWB/UNIX
 a Text-based user interface, Integrated development environment (IDE) by Microsoft, see History of Visual C++
 Phoebe Waller-Bridge, English actress, playwright, producer, and writer.